Steve "Smiley" Barnard (born 10 January 1968, London) is an English musician, songwriter and music producer, best known as a drummer for The Mock Turtles, Robbie Williams, The Mescaleros, Archive, Holy Holy, The Alarm.

Music career

Steve Barnard, also known as Smiley, began playing music at a young age and his first major success as a drummer was in 1997–1998, when he was the drummer for Robbie Williams' solo debut album, single B-sides and tours Life thru a Lens. From 1999, he joined for two years Joe Strummer's newly formed band The Mescaleros. Afterwards, Barnard joined the rock/electronica band Archive, which turned into a long-term collaboration spanning along several albums and film soundtracks. He collaborated with various other bands and musicians, including From The Jam, Gene Loves Jezebel.

In 2010, he played in the band Los Mondo Bongo, formed by Mike Peters to celebrate the music of Joe Strummer and The Mescaleros. Subsequently, he joined Peters' band The Alarm on a full-time basis, another long-term collaboration.

Since the beginning of 2022 Barnard has been playing in the band Holy Holy, performing the music of David Bowie, alongside Tony Visconti and Glenn Gregory, among others.

Steve "Smiley" Barnard is also a music producer at his studio, Sunshine Corner Studios, where he produced several artists and released eight albums of his own songs including collaborations with musicians like Bruce Foxton, Steve Norman, Richard Archer, James Stevenson, Ian McNabb.

Author

In 2020, Steve Barnard published the book Clang! Smiley Drops A Few, about his experiences in the music industry.

Discography

References

External links
Official website
Sunshine Corner Studios
Discogs
AllMusic

Living people
1968 births
English drummers
The Alarm members
Holy Holy (tribute band) members